Kim Jong-Soo (born 25 July 1986) is a South Korean footballer who plays as a centre back for Daejeon Citizen in the K League Challenge.

External links 

1989 births
Living people
Association football defenders
South Korean footballers
Gyeongnam FC players
Daejeon Hana Citizen FC players
K League 1 players